I Don't Want to Save the World is the fourth album by Cock Robin and was released in 2006. It sees the reformation of the band after a 16-year hiatus. It features a selection of their trademark harmonic pop. The lyrics seem to be greatly influenced by personal relations and experiences spent since the last time the duo of Kingsbery and LaCazio shared a pop group. An example of this is "Italian Soul", which may be a take upon the consequences of meeting and working together after a long time apart (Anna LaCazio is of mixed Italian-Chinese descent). Apart from a few TV appearances in 2006, mainly in France, the album was not widely promoted.

Track listing
 "Superhuman" – 4:32
 "I Don't Want to Save the World" – 4:01
 "Fair Enough" – 4:11
 "Across the Freeway" – 4:28
 "Touched" – 3:27
 "Body Over Mind" – 3:48
 "Bo" – 3:21
 "Through the Years" – 4:59
 "Italian Soul" – 4:22
 "The Valley Below" – 4:29
 "Dominoes" – 3:52
 "Me and My Shaman" – 4:22
 "Under the Star Which I Was Born" – 3:33

All songs by Peter Kingsbery except Italian Soul (LaCazio/Kingsbery/Wright), The Valley Below (Wright/Kingsbery) and Under The Star Which I Was Born (Polnareff/Kingsbery). This last song is a cover version of French singer-songwriter Michel Polnareff's song "Sous quelle étoile suis-je né ?"

Musicians

Cock Robin
 Peter Kingsbery: vocals, keyboards, percussion, acoustic and electric guitar
 Anna LaCazio: vocals, keyboards
 Clive Wright: electric guitar, E-bow

Additional musicians
 Victor Indrizzio: drums
 Pat Mastelotto: drums on The Valley Below and Me And My Shaman
 John Pierce: bass
 Mikal Blue: additional electric guitar
 James McCorkel: additional electric guitar

References

Cock Robin (band) albums
2006 albums